Albert Edward Shepherd VC (11 January 189723 October 1966) was an English recipient of the Victoria Cross, the highest and most prestigious award for gallantry in the face of the enemy that can be awarded to British and Commonwealth forces.

He was 20 years old, and a Rifleman in the 12th (S) Battalion, King's Royal Rifle Corps, British Army during the First World War when he performed deeds at Villers Plouich, France on 20 November 1917 for which he was awarded the VC.

The Citation 
The citation reads:

He was appointed Lance Corporal on 28 August 1916 and became acting Corporal one month later on 28 September 1916. Shepherd was awarded the French Croix de Guerre. In March 1920, the award of the French Médaille militaire was announced but a correction in January 1921 substituted the French Croix de Guerre.

The Medal 
His Victoria Cross medal group is displayed at the Royal Green Jackets (Rifles) Museum, Winchester, England.

References

Monuments to Courage (David Harvey, 1999)
The Register of the Victoria Cross (This England, 1997)

External links
KRRC Association

1897 births
1966 deaths
People from Royston, South Yorkshire
King's Royal Rifle Corps soldiers
British World War I recipients of the Victoria Cross
British Army personnel of World War I
British Army recipients of the Victoria Cross
Military personnel from Yorkshire